Mount Harding is a prominent  mountain summit located in the Boundary Ranges of the Coast Mountains, in the U.S. state of Alaska. The peak was named in 1924 by the Skagway Alpine Club to honor President Warren G. Harding (1865–1923), 29th president of the United States who visited Skagway on July 11, 1923. He was the first and only president to visit Skagway. Harding died three weeks later in San Francisco. The mountain's name was officially adopted in 1986 by the U.S. Board on Geographic Names. Precipitation runoff from the mountain drains east into Taiya Inlet, and west into Ferebee River.

Climate

Based on the Köppen climate classification, Mount Harding has a subarctic climate with cold, snowy winters, and cool summers. Weather systems coming off the Gulf of Alaska are forced upwards by the Coast Mountains (orographic lift), causing heavy precipitation in the form of rainfall and snowfall. Temperatures can drop below −20 °C with wind chill factors below −30 °C. This climate supports a glacier south of the summit, and a smaller one on the northwest slope. The months May through July offer the most favorable weather for viewing or climbing Mount Harding.

See also

List of mountain peaks of Alaska
Geography of Alaska

References

External links
 Mount Harding: weather forecast

Harding
Harding
Harding